Sem de Wit (born 30 March 1995) is a Dutch professional footballer who plays as a centre-back for DVS '33.

Career

Netherlands 
After playing for various youth teams in the Netherlands, de Wit made his debut for Almere City FC on 14 September 2012 vs. SC Cambuur.  Across 2 seasons with Almere City, he made 28 total appearances (27 in the Eerste Divisie).

de Wit then joined ADO Den Haag, and was loaned out to FC Dordrecht.  However, he did not make any appearances for Dordrecht's first team. de Wit later joined Fortuna Sittard on loan, where he made 14 appearances in the 2014–15 Eerste Divisie.

United States 
After playing four seasons in the Netherlands, de Wit joined USL club Vancouver Whitecaps 2. He was called up to the first team six times, making his debut in a 2016 friendly against Crystal Palace FC. In 2017, he signed a short-term non-MLS agreement with the club to appear for the club in the Canadian Championship, appearing for the club on May 23 against the Montreal Impact.

de Wit joined FC Cincinnati ahead of the 2017 USL season.

Ahead of their inaugural season in 2019, de Wit joined USL Championship side Hartford Athletic.

Germany 
Ahead of the 2020–21 season, de Wit joined Regionalliga West club SV Straelen.

References

External links
 
 Sem de Wit Interview

1995 births
Living people
Dutch footballers
Almere City FC players
FC Dordrecht players
ADO Den Haag players
Fortuna Sittard players
de Wit, Sem
de Wit, Sem
de Wit, Sem
Eredivisie players
Eerste Divisie players
Footballers from Utrecht (city)
de Wit, Sem
Association football defenders